The Honorable Andre Neville Nobbs is a political figure from the Australian territory of Norfolk Island.
He was elected to the Norfolk Island legislative Assembly in 2007 to become the Chief Minister and re-elected in 2010 as Minister for Tourism, Industry and Development.

Chief Minister of Norfolk Island

He was the Chief Minister of Norfolk Island, serving from 28 March 2007, until 24 March 2010. He both succeeded and was succeeded by David Buffett.

See also

 Politics of Norfolk Island

References

Heads of government of Norfolk Island
Living people
Year of birth missing (living people)